Foued Khrayfi (born 28 April 1991) is a retired Tunisian football striker.

References

1991 births
Living people
Tunisian footballers
CS Sfaxien players
US Monastir (football) players
Stade Gabèsien players
ES Métlaoui players
US Tataouine players
Association football forwards
Tunisian Ligue Professionnelle 1 players